Devout/The Modern Hymn is an album from punk band Scatter The Ashes. It was released on May 25, 2004.

Critical reception
AllMusic wrote: "Words, melodies, shifting, complex, and syncopated rhythmic structures are wed to adventurous harmonics that are thunderously, chaotically beautiful." Exclaim! wrote that "though slightly too atmospheric and brooding at times, Devout/The Modern Hymn is an impressive debut for a band whose sound is clearly theirs alone."

Track listing
"Caesura"  – 3:06
"City in the Sea"  – 4:25
"Division"  – 3:49
"Affinity" – 3:41
"Citadel (The New Fall Forest)" – 4:09
"Hour Invocation"  – 3:25
"White Actress"  – 4:29
"In the Company of Wolves"  – 3:03
"Christine Daae"  – 3:52
"Hour Benediction"  – 5:43

References

2004 albums
Scatter the Ashes albums